The C.P. Hoogenhout Award is awarded since 1960 to recognize the best original Afrikaans book for children between seven and twelve years of age. The South African Library Association instituted the prize for the best children's picture book. In earlier years the prize was awarded annually, but since 1982 it is awarded every two years. Since 2000 the awards have been sponsored by the SALI Trust. Previous winners are:
 1960 - W.O. Kühne (Huppel verjaar)
 1961 - Alba Bouwer (Katrientjie van Keerweder)
 1962 - No award made
 1963 - F. du Plessis (author) and Katrine Harries (illustrator) (Rympieboek vir kleuters)
 1964 - Freda Linde (Snoet-alleen)
 1965 - No award made
 1966 - Günther Komnick (illustrator) (for Botter-aas written by Freda Linde)
 1967 - Günther Komnick (illustrator) (for Die stadsmusikante written by Freda Linde)
 1968 - Pieter W. Grobbelaar (author) and Katrine Harries (illustrator) (Die mooiste Afrikaanse sprokies)
 1969 - No award made
 1970 - No award made
 1971 - Alba Bouwer ('n Hennetjie met kuikens)
 1972 - No award made
 1973 - Freda Linde (Jos en Klos)
 1974 - Freda Linde (By die oog van die fontein)
 1975 -No award made
 1976 - Rona Rupert (Wat maak jy, Hektor?)
 1977 - Freda Linde (Die kokkewiet en sy vrou)
 1978 - No award made
 1979 - Hester Heese (Sêra Madêra)
 1980 - No award made
 1980 - No award made
 1981 - No award made
 1982-1983 - Alba Bouwer (Vlieg, swaeltjie, vlieg)
 1984-1985 - Tafelberg Uitgewers (Goue lint, my storie begint)
 1986-1987 - No award made
 1988-1989 - No award made
 1990-1991 - Barrie Hough (Droomwa)
 1992-1993 - No award made
 1994-1995 - Martie Preller (Anderkantland)
 1996-1997 - Janie Oosthuysen (Ouma Hester en die Dreadnought Merk III, Juffrou Luisenbosch en die breinwassers)
 1998-1999 - Verna Vels (Liewe Heksie en die rekenaar)
 2000-2001 - No award made
 2002-2003 - No award made
 2004-2005 - Leon de Villiers (Droomoog Diepgrawer)
 2006-2007 - Jaco Jacobs (Wurms met tamatiesous en ander lawwe rympies)

References

Children's literary awards
South African literary awards
Afrikaans
South African literary events